Skjeggedal is a small village in the municipality of Ullensvang in Vestland county, Norway. The village is mostly made up of holiday cottages and a large hydroelectric power station near the large Ringedals Dam on the lake Ringedalsvatnet.

Media gallery

References

Villages in Vestland
Ullensvang